Karacasu is a town and district of Aydın Province, Turkey.

Karacasu may also refer to:

 Karacasu, Bolu, a town in the central district of Bolu Province, Turkey
 Karacasu Dam, a dam in Turkey